Ginko Abukawa-Chiba (虻川-千葉 吟子, born Abukawa; February 25, 1938) is a retired Japanese gymnast. She competed in all artistic gymnastics events at the 1960 and 1964 Olympics and won a team bronze medal in 1964. Her best individual achievement was tenth place on the vault in 1964.

References

External links

 
 

1938 births
Living people
Japanese female artistic gymnasts
Olympic gymnasts of Japan
Gymnasts at the 1960 Summer Olympics
Gymnasts at the 1964 Summer Olympics
Olympic bronze medalists for Japan
Olympic medalists in gymnastics
Medalists at the 1964 Summer Olympics
Medalists at the World Artistic Gymnastics Championships
20th-century Japanese women